The 2009 Women's Hockey Champions Challenge II was held from June 21 to June 27, 2009 in Kazan, Russia.

India won the tournament after defeating Belgium 6–3 in the final, gaining qualification to the 2011 Women's Hockey Champions Challenge I.

Results
All times are Moscow Daylight Time (UTC+4)

First round

Pool A

Pool B

Fifth to eighth place classification

Crossover

Seventh and eighth place

Fifth and sixth place

First to fourth place classification

Semifinals

Third and fourth place

Final

Awards

Statistics

Final ranking

References

External links
Official FIH Report

2009
2009 in women's field hockey
2009 in Russian women's sport
International women's field hockey competitions hosted by Russia
Sport in Kazan
21st century in Kazan
June 2009 sports events in Europe